The Orangeville Crushers were a Canadian Junior "A" ice hockey team from Orangeville, Ontario.  They played in the Ontario Junior Hockey League, Midwestern Junior B Hockey League, and Mid-Ontario Junior C Hockey League.

History
Founded in 1975, the Stonecrushers sat out the 1978-79 season.  The owners of the team opted to attempt to field a team in the Georgian Bay Intermediate A Hockey League by the name of the Orangeville Cougars.  The Cougars only won twice in all of 1978-79 and the Stonecrushers were brought back for 1979-80.

The team originated in the Central Ontario Junior C Hockey League, after one season in the league it became the Mid-Ontario Junior C Hockey League.  In the late 1980s and early 1990s, the Crushers played in the Mid-Ontario Junior C Hockey League and won two straight league championships. They won the Clarence Schmalz Cup in 1990 as All-Ontario Champions.  In the Clarence Schmalz Cup Finals, the Crushers came back from a 3-0 deficit in games to defeat the Belle River Canadiens of the Great Lakes Junior C Hockey League 4-3.  The 1991 Clarence Schmalz Cup Final pitted the Crushers against a bound and determined Hanover Barons of the Western Junior C Hockey League.  The Crushers again went down 3-0 in games and again forced a seventh and deciding contest but came out on the losing end, dropping the final game and the series 4-3.

In the mid-1990s, the Crushers were accepted into the Midwestern Junior B Hockey League and stayed there until 2006.   Orangeville had been accepted to play in the Ontario Provincial Junior A Hockey League for the start of the 2006-07 Season.  A vote was concocted by the OPJHL teams, where the Crushers were voted in by a 33-3 vote.  The Crushers would play out of the North Division.  The team's head coach for the beginning of 2006-07 would be Steve Chelios, brother of National Hockey League great Chris Chelios .  Chelios was let go in late October.  The President of the team is another former NHLer, Dale Hawerchuk.

Junior A
The Crushers' first Junior "A" game took place on September 15, 2006 against Vaughan Vipers in Orangeville.  The game resulted in a 6-3 loss.  The Crushers' first ever Junior "A" goal was scored by Trevor Branning at 1:17 into the first period.  Anthony Ferrante started the game in net.

The Crushers' first ever Junior "A" win was against the Stouffville Spirit on September 28, 2006 in Stouffville, Ontario.  The final score was 3-2, with goaltender Michael Hutchinson picking up the win in net.  Hutchinson stopped 35 of 37 shots, as the Crushers were badly outshot.  Hutchinson also held the Spirit scoreless for the first 48:13 of the game, coming within less than 12 minutes of the shutout.  The Crushers' Wil Munson of Corona, California scored the eventual game winner.

The Crushers finished the season one point out of the final playoff spot.  With three games to go in the season, Orangeville either had to win or tie to clinch a spot or the Buffalo Jr. Sabres had to tie or lose—neither happened.

Team owner and National Hockey League Hockey Hall of Famer Dale Hawerchuk took over as head coach. In 2010, the changed its name to the Flyers.

On April 3, 2011, despite three consecutive .500 or more seasons, the franchise ceased operations.  A week later, the owner of the Villanova Knights announced that he was moving the Knights to Orangeville and renaming them the "Orangeville Flyers".

Season-by-season results

Clarence Schmalz Cup appearances
1990: Orangeville Crushers defeated Belle River Canadiens 4-games-to-3
1991: Hanover Barons defeated Orangeville Crushers 4-games-to-3

Notable alumni	
Darryl Bootland
Chris Neil
Gary Sabourin
Michael Hutchinson
Dan Ellis

External links
Orangeville Crushers Official Site

Ontario Provincial Junior A Hockey League teams
Sport in Orangeville, Ontario